William Francisco da Silva Macário (born July 1, 1991) is a Brazilian mixed martial artist currently competing as a welterweight. A professional competitor since 2010, he has formerly competed for the UFC and was a contestant on The Ultimate Fighter: Brazil 2.

Background
Macário is from Brazil and was first exposed to mixed martial arts growing up, watching PRIDE fights, and was a fan of Wanderlei Silva and Antônio Rodrigo Nogueira, who were both champions in their respective divisions. Macário began to train in Muay Thai, until he was 14 years old and met his future coach, who invited the young Macário to come to his gym and train.

Mixed martial arts career

Early career
Macário made his MMA professional debut against Gilmar Souza Milhorance on August 15, 2010. He won the fight via TKO in the first round. Macario compiled an undefeated professional record of 6–0 before being invited to compete on The Ultimate Fighter: Brazil 2.

The Ultimate Fighter
In March 2013, it was revealed that Macário was a cast member of The Ultimate Fighter: Brazil 2.
He won his elimination fight to get into the TUF house, defeating Roberto Corvo by TKO in round 1.  He was chosen to be a member of Team Nogueira. Over the course of the show, Santos defeated Thiago Marreta by unanimous decision and Tiago Alves by TKO to reach the semifinals.  In the semifinals, he faced Viscardi Andrade winning the fight by TKO in round 3. He was expected to face Santiago Ponzinibbio in the final. However, Ponzinibbio broke his hand during his semifinal fight and was replaced by Leonardo Santos.

Ultimate Fighting Championship
Macário fought Leonardo Santos in the finals on June 8, 2013 at UFC on Fuel TV 10.  After a strong first round, Macário seemed to tire and was submitted in the second round.

Macário faced Bobby Voelker on December 28, 2013 at UFC 168. Macário won the fight via a dominant unanimous decision.

Macário was expected to face Neil Magny at UFC Fight Night 40.  However, Macário was removed from the bout for undisclosed reasons and replaced by returning veteran Tim Means.

A rescheduled bout with Magny took place on October 25, 2014 at UFC 179. Macário lost the bout via TKO in the third round.

Macário faced Matt Dwyer on February 22, 2015 at UFC Fight Night 61. Macário lost the fight via knockout in the first round.

Macário was expected to face Brendan O'Reilly on November 15, 2015 at UFC 193. However, Macário pulled out of the bout in late September citing injury and was replaced by James Moontasri. In turn, Macario was released from the promotion.

Post-UFC career
After winning two fights in the regional circuit in his native Brazil, he signed with Legacy Fighting Alliance. Macário made his promotional debut against Ramiz Brahimaj at LFA 47 and lost by way of guillotine choke in the second round.

Macário faced Josh Burkman at Legacy Fighting Alliance 66 on May 10, 2019. He won the fight via split decision.

On July 28, 2020, it was announced that Macário had signed a contract with Taura MMA. He made his promotional debut against Will Chope at Taura MMA 11 on October 30, 2020. He lost the fight via unanimous decision.

Macário faced Lucas Paredes on July 29, 2021 at Nação Cyborg 9. He won the bout in the first round via KO, winning the NC Welterweight Championship in the process.

Macário was scheduled to face Ramazan Kuramagomedov at UAE Warriors 22 on September 4, 2021. However, Macário withdrew from the bout and was replaced by Matias Juarez.

Macário faced Shimon Smotritsky on December 18, 2021 at RCC 10. He lost the bout via TKO in the second round.

Macário faced Luan Santiago on September 25, 2022 at Fight Music Show 2. He lost the bout via TKO stoppage after gettign dropped by a punch and finished on the ground with elbows 22 seconds into the bout.

Championships and Accomplishments
Ultimate Fighting Championship
The Ultimate Fighter: Brazil 2 Welterweight Tournament Finalist

Mixed martial arts record

|-
|Loss
|align=center|11–7
|Luan Santiago
|KO (punches)
|Fight Music Show 2
|
|align=center|1
|align=center|0:22
|Curitiba, Brazil
|
|-
|Loss
|align=center|11–6
|Shimon Smotritsky
| TKO (punches)
|RCC 10
|
|align=center|2
|align=center|2:03
|Yekaterinburg, Russia
|
|-
|Win
|align=center|11–5
|Lucas Paredes
| KO (punch)
| Nação Cyborg 9
|
|align=center|1
|align=center|1:50
|Paraná, Brazil
|
|-
|Loss
|align=center|10–5
|Rico Farrington
|Decision (unanimous)
|Taura MMA 11
|
|align=center| 3
|align=center| 5:00
|Kissimmee, Florida, United States
|
|-
|Win
|align=center|10–4
|Josh Burkman 
|Decision (split)
|LFA 66
|
|align=center|3
|align=center|5:00
|West Valley City, Utah, United States
|
|-
|Loss
|align=center|9–4
|Ramiz Brahimaj
|Technical Submission (guillotine choke)
|LFA 47
|
|align=center|2
|align=center|2:34
|Dallas, Texas, United States
|
|-
|Win
|align=center|9–3
|Handeson Ferreira
|Decision (split)
|F2N: Fight2Night2
|
|align=center|3
|align=center|5:00
|Foz do Iguaçu, Brazil
|
|-
|Win
|align=center|8–3
|Bojan Kosednar
|TKO (punches)
|F2N: Fight2Night
|
|align=center|1
|align=center|N/A
|Rio de Janeiro, Brazil
|
|-
|Loss
|align=center|7–3
|Matt Dwyer
|KO (Superman punch)
|UFC Fight Night: Bigfoot vs. Mir
|
|align=center|1
|align=center|3:14
|Porto Alegre, Brazil
|
|-
|Loss
|align=center|7–2
|Neil Magny
|TKO (punches)
|UFC 179
|
|align=center|3
|align=center|2:40
|Rio de Janeiro, Brazil
|
|-
|Win
|align=center|7–1
| Bobby Voelker
| Decision (unanimous)
| UFC 168
| 
|align=center|3
|align=center|5:00
| Las Vegas, Nevada, United States
| 
|-
|Loss
|align=center|6–1
|  Leonardo Santos
|Submission (arm-triangle choke)
|UFC on Fuel TV: Nogueira vs. Werdum
|
|align=center|2
|align=center|4:43
|  Fortaleza, Brazil
|
|-
|Win
|align=center|6–0
|  Paulo Silva
|Submission (rear-naked choke)
|Ibiuna Fight
|
|align=center|1
|align=center|1:56
|  Ibiúna, Brazil
|
|-
|Win
|align=center|5–0
|  Roger Berger
|TKO (punches)
|WOCS 17
|
|align=center|1
|align=center|2:40
|  Rio de Janeiro, Brazil
|
|-
|Win
|align=center|4–0
|  Gabriel Monkey
|TKO (punches)
|Rio FC 5
|
|align=center|2
|align=center|0:46
|  Rio de Janeiro, Brazil
|
|-
|Win
|align=center|3–0
|  Lucas Rosa 
|TKO (punches)
|Rio FC 4
|
|align=center|1
|align=center|1:54
|  Rio de Janeiro, Brazil
|
|-
|Win
|align=center|2–0
|  Romulo Silva
|TKO (punches)
|BPTC: K-1 Super Kombat 2
|
|align=center|1
|align=center|1:30
|  São João de Meriti, Brazil
|
|-
|Win
|align=center|1–0
|  Gilmar Milhorance
|TKO (punches)
|Gringo Super Fight 2
|
|align=center|1
|align=center|0:35
|  Nova Iguaçu, Brazil
|
|-

Mixed martial arts exhibition record

|-
|Win
|align=center|4–0
|  Viscardi Andrade
|TKO (punches)
|The Ultimate Fighter: Brazil 2
|N/A
|align=center|3
|align=center|N/A
|  São Paulo, Brazil
|
|-
|Win
|align=center|3–0
|  Tiago Alves
|TKO (punches)
|The Ultimate Fighter: Brazil 2
|N/A
|align=center|1
|align=center|N/A
|  São Paulo, Brazil
|
|-
|Win
|align=center|2–0
|  Thiago Santos
|Decision (unanimous)
|The Ultimate Fighter: Brazil 2
|N/A
|align=center|2
|align=center|5:00
|  São Paulo, Brazil
|
|-
|Win
|align=center|1–0
|  Roberto Barros Amorim
|TKO (doctor stoppage)
|The Ultimate Fighter: Brazil 2
|N/A
|align=center|1
|align=center|N/A
|  São Paulo, Brazil
| 
|-

See also
 List of male mixed martial artists

References

External links
 
 

Living people
Brazilian male mixed martial artists
Welterweight mixed martial artists
Mixed martial artists utilizing Muay Thai
Mixed martial artists utilizing Brazilian jiu-jitsu
Brazilian practitioners of Brazilian jiu-jitsu
Brazilian Muay Thai practitioners
1991 births
Ultimate Fighting Championship male fighters
Sportspeople from Rio de Janeiro (city)